Fawn Parker is a Canadian writer, whose novel What We Both Know was longlisted for the 2022 Giller Prize.

Parker, who holds an MA in creative writing from the University of Toronto and is studying at the University of New Brunswick to obtain her Ph.D., previously published the short story collection Looking Good and Having a Great Time (2015), the poetry collection Weak Spot (2018), and the novels Set-Point (2019) and Dumb Show (2021).

References

21st-century Canadian novelists
21st-century Canadian short story writers
21st-century Canadian poets
21st-century Canadian women writers
Canadian women novelists
Canadian women short story writers
Canadian women poets
Living people
Year of birth missing (living people)